Gvidonas Markevičius (born November 22, 1969) is a Lithuanian retired professional basketball player.

National team career
Markevičius was a member of the Lithuanian national team which won silver medals at the EuroBasket 1995.

References

1969 births
Living people
Basket Zielona Góra players
LSU-Atletas basketball players
Lithuanian men's basketball players
Place of birth missing (living people)
Point guards
Shooting guards